Valentin Slavikovski (Belarusian: Славiкоускi Валянцiн Валянцiнавiч; born December 9, 1990, in Minsk, Belarus) is a professional Belarusian kickboxer. 

He is an International Master of Sports in Thai boxing, a member of the Belarusian Kickboxing, the Thai Boxing Federation, and also the Belarusian Pankration Federation. Standing in at 6 ft 23 (190 cm), and weighing 223 lbs (101 kg), Slavikovski has earned many heavyweight titles and championship medals, including the Gold medal from the Baltic Games. He was also a winner in the Central Asian Games. In 2013 he even received the President Award from President Sports Club for his achievements in international competitions.

Early life 
Valentin Slavikovski was born on December 9, 1990. While growing up in Minsk, Belarus, Slavikovski began showing an interest in boxing while still in grade school. Continuing with his education, Slavikovski finished grade school and also completed a firefighting training course. 

After graduating, Slavikovski was accepted into the Belarusian National Technical University (BNTY). Balancing his studies and ambitions to be a boxer, Slavikovski earned a specialty in Mining Engineering, all while continuing to train and condition his body for the boxing world.

Training 
As he became more involved and dedicated to becoming a professional boxer, Slavikovski reached out to some of the best coaches in the business. His first coach was Kapshay Gennady Pavlovich, who is today the Head Coach of the Russian Mixed Martial Arts (MMA) team. Dmitry Shakuta, a professional Belarusian kickboxer, honored Master of Sports, all-round champion, and twelve-time kickboxing and Thai boxing world champion, also helped transform Slavikovski into the success he is today.

Career Highlights 
Valentin Slavikovski is well known for his victories throughout the World Association of Kickboxing Organizations (WAKO). Thousands of men and women, from over twenty different countries come together to compete for the organization each year. In 2010, Slavikovski took 2nd place at the XVI World Cup for Kickboxing. From the years of 2011 to 2013, Slavikovski took 1st at each of the annual World Cup competitions, in the same sport.

Valentin Slavikovski's victory in the international tournament in Muay Thai and classic boxing at the Sports Palace in Minsk, Belarus, proved himself to be a bright and promising fighter. The tournament brought crowds of professional fighters, fans and entertainment professionals to the fight featuring Slavikovski, and Ukrainian Thai boxing champion, Roman Cricklya.  Slavikovski battled his worthy opponent, each delivering crushing blows and keeping the audience on their feet throughout. The heavyweight's fight finally came to an end with Slavikovski and his expertly timed moves and techniques winning the fight.

On April 14, 2012, at the Sports Palace in Minsk, Belarus, the fights for the qualifying round of the international tournament, Fight Code for TNA Muay Thai, took place. The event was broadcast in 49 countries around the world. The award-winning professional fighter Oleg Priymachev, of Ukraine, fought against Slavikovski. Although it was a tough fight, Slavikovski won against his opponent and gained even more media attention.

The international tournament of kickboxing also known as Night of Muay Thai (February 22, 2013), hosted by Soviet Wings Sport Palace in Moscow, Russia, housed some of the strongest professional fighters the world had ever seen. Here Slavikovski fought against the multiple world championship holder in Thai boxing, Dmitry Bezus, of Ukraine. The two heavyweights battled it out until the referee and judges awarded the title to Slavikovski.

Equally memorable was Slavikovski's fight during the Fights on TNA rules for TATNEFT Cup in 2014. The selection of fighters was formed by a pyramid system and a long list of rigid rules. Sportsmen from countries such as Europe, Asia, South America, and Africa are invited to the world championship, however, only titled sportsmen, such as Slavikovski, are allowed to participate. Here, Slavikovski went up against Moroccan, Mohamed Boubkari. In the fight with his very experienced opponent, Slavikovski held up his strength, accuracy, and mental control over Boubkari. By a unanimous decision, Slavikovski won the match.

The semi-finals for the Fights on TNA were held in Kazan, Russia, where  the second phase of the quarterfinal matches took place. A very talented, Stefan Andjelkovic, who had already won several titles in kickboxing, was to fight against Slavikovski. The heavyweights ferociously attacked one another during the three rounds. Since both men were somewhat evenly matched in strength and agility, a required additional fourth round was set up. By the end of the fourth round and by a unanimous decision, Slavikovski who demonstrated his speed and advantage over his opponent was announced as the winner.

In 2015 in Grozny, Chechen Republic, the Coliseum Arena hosted a large-scale professional kickboxing tournament called Absolute Championship Berkut-17(ACB-KB17). The capital of the Chechen Republic saw 14 fights in professional kickboxing, in which fighters from Russia, Serbia, Croatia, Netherlands, Morocco, South Korea, and the United States participated. During the tenth fight, Slavikovski defeated Kirill Kornilov of Russia and earned his place in the semi-finals.

Grand Prix Absolute Championship Berkut was held in Anapa, Russia in September 2015.  Here Slavikovski once again proved himself to be a great fighter by defeating Stefan Andjelkovic, once again. Throughout the years, Slavikovski has beaten his foes and has become a true professional. His high mobility, athleticism, endurance, and intelligence are unmatched and have led him to victory every time.

Personal life 
Though professional fighting is a passion of his, Slavikovski also enjoys activities outside of boxing. He loves diving, swimming, and horseback riding. Also, a fact that few people know about him is that he is a Stuntman. Slavikovski even finished Stuntman training and has acted in several different movies.

Kickboxing record 

|-
|-  bgcolor="#FFBBBB" 
| 2015-10-16
| Loss
|align=left| Jhonata Diniz
| ACB KB-3 Sibiu Grand Prix Final
| Sibiu, Romania
| KO
|  
| 
|-
|-  bgcolor="#CCFFCC"
| 2015-09-27
| Win
|align=left| Stefan Andjelkovic
| ACB KB-2 Grand Prix, 1/2 final 
| Anapa, Russia
| Decision
| 3
| 3:00 
|-
|-  bgcolor="#FFBBBB"
| 2015-08-15
| Loss
|align=left| Jahfarr Wilnis
| Kunlun Fight 29
| Sochi, Russia
| Decision
| 3
| 3:00 
|-
|-  bgcolor="#CCFFCC"
| 2015-04-24
| Win
|align=left| Kiril Kornilov
| АСВ- КВ 1» Grand Prix, 1/4 final 
| Grozny, Chechen Republic
| Decision
| 3
| 3:00 
|-
|-  bgcolor="#FFBBBB"
| 2014-07-18
| Loss 
|align=left| Igor Bugaenko||TatNeft Arena, Fights on TNA rules for TATNEFT Cup 2014, 1/2 final
| Kazan, Russia
| Decision
| 4
| 3:00 
|-
|-  bgcolor="#CCFFCC"
| 2014-05-28
| Win
|align=left| Stefan Andjelkovic
| TatNeft Arena, Fights on TNA rules for TATNEFT Cup 2014, 1/4 final
| Kazan, Russia
| Decision
| 4 
| 3:00 
|-
|-  bgcolor="#CCFFCC"
| 2014-02-15
| Win
|align=left| Mohamed Boubkari
| TatNeft Arena, Fights on TNA rules for TATNEFT Cup 2014, 1/8 final
| Kazan, Russia
| Decision
| 4
| 3:00 
|-
|-  bgcolor="#CCFFCC"
| 2013-02-22
| Win
|align=left| Dmitry Bezus
| Бойцовский международный турнир «Ночь тайского бокса»
| Moscow, Russia
| Decision
| 3
| 3:00 
|-
|-  bgcolor="#CCFFCC"
| 2011-12-03
|Win
|align=left|  Sharipov
| Mixed martial arts tournament Crown of Moscow
| Moscow, Russia
| KO
| 
| 3:00
|-
|-  bgcolor="#CCFFCC" 
| 2011-03-19
| Win
|align=left| Dmitry Belyaev
| K1 «VICTORY AND CLORY»
| Lukow, Poland 
| Decision 
| 3 
| 3:00 
|-
|-
| colspan=9 | Legend:

See also 
List of K-1 events
List of male kickboxers

References 

Belarusian male kickboxers
Sportspeople from Minsk
1990 births
Living people
Kunlun Fight kickboxers